The 2014 forest fire season in the Northwest Territories of Canada is reputed to be the worst for at least three decades. As of 3 July, there had been 123 fires reported in the territory, of which at least 92 were still active and 13 were thought to be human-caused.  By 9 July the total had reached 164 fires and on 10 July over 130 fires were thought to be burning. The smoke generated by the fires was blown into the Prairie Provinces and created a moderate health risk there leading Environment Canada to declare an air quality advisory for southern Saskatchewan and Manitoba on 9 July.

The smoke was also observed drifting north into Nunavut and east to the Maritime Provinces and as far as Portugal. By 9 July an area of  had been consumed, about the size of the island of Trinidad.

As of 18 September 2014, the Government of the Northwest Territories estimated that  of forest had been burnt and that the fire fighting cost C$55 million (US$44.37 million).

One study suggested that a record number of lightning ignitions during 2014 drove a significant amount of the fires. The Northwest Territories complex emitted 164 teragrams of carbon (TgC).

See also 
 List of fires in Canada

References 

2014 wildfires
2014 disasters in Canada
Wildfires in Canada
Disasters in the Northwest Territories
Natural disasters in the Northwest Territories